Derek Freeman MBE, was a dog breeder who is famed for his work with the UK charity, Guide Dogs for the Blind Association, which he joined in 1959. He reared over 20,000 puppies and also regularly appeared on Blue Peter.

References

Dog breeders
Year of death missing
Year of birth missing
Members of the Order of the British Empire